Robert Thomas "Bob" Francoeur Ph.D., A.C.S. (October 18, 1931 – October 15, 2012) was an American biologist and sexologist.

Life and career
Francoeur was born on October 18, 1931, in Detroit, Michigan. He earned a B.A. in philosophy and English at Sacred Heart College in 1953, a M.A. in Catholic theology at Saint Vincent College in 1957, a M.S. in biology at the University of Detroit in 1961, a Ph.D. in experimental embryology at the University of Delaware in 1967, and an A.C.S. in sexology at the Institute for the Advanced Study of Human Sexuality in 1979. He received the "Golden Brick Award" from the Center for Family Life Education for outstanding contributions to sexuality education in 2008 and was chosen by the German Society for Social-Scientific Sexuality Research to receive the Magnus Hirschfeld Medal for Sexual Reform in 2008.

Trained in embryology, evolution, theology, and the humanities, Francoeur's main work was to synthesize and integrate the findings of primary sexological researchers. He is the author of twenty-two books, contributor to seventy-eight textbooks, handbooks, and encyclopedias, and the author of fifty-eight technical papers on various aspects of sexuality. His books include The Scent of Eros: Mysteries of Odor in Human Sexuality (1995), Becoming a Sexual Person (1982, 1984, 1991) and Taking Sides: Clashing Views on Controversial Issues in Human Sexuality (1987, 1989, 1991, 1993, 1998, 2000) - two college textbooks, Utopian Motherhood: New Trends in Human Reproduction (1970, 1974, 1977), Eve's New Rib: 20 Faces of Sex, Marriage, and Family (1972), Hot and Cool Sex: Cultures in Conflict (1974), and The Future of Sexual Relations (1974). He is editor-in-chief of The Complete Dictionary of Sexology (1991, 1995) and The International Encyclopedia of Sexuality. A fellow of the Society for the Scientific Study of Sexuality and past president of the Society's Eastern Region, he is also a charter member of the American College of Sexology. He served as professor of biological and allied health sciences at Fairleigh Dickinson University, adjunct professor in the doctoral Program in Human Sexuality at New York University, and professor in the New York University “Sexuality in Two Cultures” program in Copenhagen.

He received the 2008 Magnus Hirschfeld Medal.

Selected publications
Books
Becoming a Sexual Person (1982) 
International Encyclopedia of Sexuality (1997-2001) 
Utopian Motherhood: New Trends in Human Reproduction
Biomedical Ethics: A Guide to Decision Making
The Scent of Eros: Mysteries of Odor in Human Sexuality (with JV Kohl)
The Complete Dictionary of Sexology
Hot & Cool Sex: Cultures in Conflict
Religious Reactions to Alternative Lifestyles
The Future of Sexual Relations (with AK Francoeur)
Eve's New Rib: Twenty Faces of Sex, Marriage, and Family
The Continuum Complete International Encyclopedia of Sexuality (2004) )
Taking sides: Clashing Views on Controversial Issues in Human Sexuality
A Descriptive Dictionary and Atlas of Sexology

Articles

Talk Show Appearances
The David Frost Show January 5, 1971; Season 3, Episode 69
The Dick Cavett Show May 23, 1972; Episode 257 on ABC
The Dick Cavett Show June 20, 1972; Episode 353 on ABC; with Robert Rimmer and Barbara Williamson

References

External links
 Sexology Institute brief bio
 Short biography in The International Encyclopedia of Sexuality

American sexologists
American biologists
American theologians
Fairleigh Dickinson University faculty
Institute for Advanced Study of Human Sexuality alumni
Sacred Heart Major Seminary alumni
Saint Vincent College alumni
University of Delaware alumni
University of Detroit Mercy alumni
1931 births
2012 deaths